RecQ-mediated genome instability protein 1 is a protein that in humans is encoded by the RMI1 gene.

Genetic disorders
Mutations in RMI1 are associated with Bloom-Syndrome like disorder. Two patients, both with microcephalic dwarfism came from the same family. They carried identical heterozygous mutations: [1255_1259del][Lys419LeufsTer5].

Function 
RMI1 protein is a component of the Bloom Syndrome Complex. RMI1 protein is made up of 2 OB (oligonucleotide binding) domains. OB1 binds to Topoisomerase III alpha, while OB2 binds to RMI2 within the Bloom Syndrome complex, and FANCM of the Fanconi Anaemia pathway. 

An insert within OB1 domain of RMI1 inserts into the catalytic centre of Topoisomerase III alpha, and is necessary for the optimal activity of this enzyme during cellular DNA repair and homologous recombination.

Meiosis
During meiosis in budding yeast Saccharomyces cerevisiae, TOP3 (a type I topoisomerase) and its accessory factor RMI1 form a heterodimer that functions to allow passage of one DNA single strand through another. The TOP3-RMI1 heterodimer associates with Sgs1 (Bloom helicase ortholog) to form a complex that catalyzes dissolution of double Holliday junctions.  Furthermore, the TOP3-RMI1 heterodimer participates in all meiotic recombination functions associated with Sgs1, most significantly as an early recombination intermediate chaperone, promoting regulated crossover and non-crossover recombination and preventing accumulation of aberrant recombination intermediates. In particular, the TOP3-RMI1–SGS1 complex promotes early formation of non-crossover recombinants during meiosis.

References

Further reading